Action film directors guide the filming and creative elements in action movies, a film genre where action sequences, such as fights, shootouts, stunts, car chases or explosions either take precedence, or, in finer examples of the genre, are used as a form of exposition and character development. Action movie directors may also blend other genres into their films such as romance, science fiction, fantasy, comedy, drama, horror, etc... This genre is closely linked with those of thriller and adventure films.

Notable directors 
Jon Amiel
Paul W. S. Anderson
Michael Apted
Newt Arnold
David Ayer
John Badham
Jose Balagtas
Andrzej Bartkowiak
Craig R. Baxley
Michael Bay
Henry Bean
Peter Berg
Luc Besson
Kathryn Bigelow
Neill Blomkamp
Bong Joon-ho
Marco Brambilla
James Cameron
Martin Campbell
Joe Carnahan
John Carpenter
D. J. Caruso
Steve Carver
Enzo G. Castellari
Benny Chan
Stephen Chow
Robert Clouse
Rob Cohen
Sergio Corbucci
George Pan Cosmatos
Andrew Davis
Jan De Bont
Brian De Palma
Jonathan Demme
Ernest Dickerson
Mark DiSalle
H. Tjut Djalil
Roger Donaldson
Richard Donner
Breck Eisner
Roland Emmerich
Gareth Evans
Jon Favreau
Sam Firstenberg
Isaac Florentine
John Flynn
John Ford
John Frankenheimer
William Friedkin
Kinji Fukasaku
Stephen Fung
Antoine Fuqua
Christophe Gans
Lewis Gilbert
John Glen
James Glickenhaus
Menahem Golan
Allan A. Goldstein
David S. Goyer
F. Gary Gray
Paul Greengrass
Guy Hamilton
Tsui Hark
Renny Harlin
Jonathan Hensleigh
Anthony Hickox
Walter Hill
Stephen Hopkins
Patrick Hughes
Peter R. Hunt
Brian G. Hutton
John Hyams
Peter Hyams
John Irvin
Hugh Johnson
Joe Johnston
Michael Caton-Jones
Irvin Kershner
Kim Jee-woon
Andrei Konchalovsky
Ted Kotcheff
Jan Kounen
Akira Kurosawa
Robert Kurtzman
Ringo Lam
Jess Lapid, Jr.
Lito Lapid
Andrew Lau
Mimi Leder
Ang Lee
Daniel Lee
Danny Lee
David Leitch
Sergio Leone
Mark L. Lester
Richard Lester
Louis Leterrier
Sheldon Lettich
Jonathan Liebesman
Doug Liman
Justin Lin
Dwight H. Little
Lo Wei
William Lustig
Jennifer Lynch
Peter MacDonald
Alan Mak
Bruce Malmuth
Michael Mann
James Mangold
Antonio Margheriti
Baldo Marro
Nico Mastorakis
Bruno Mattei
Olivier Megaton
Sam Mendes
McG
Andrew V. McLaglen
John McTiernan
Christopher McQuarrie
Takashi Miike
Willie Milan
John Milius
George Miller
Steve Miner
Cesar Montano
John Moore
Pierre Morel
Russell Mulcahy
Geoff Murphy
Chris Nahon
Hal Needham
Neveldine/Taylor
Ilya Naishuller
Linh Nga
Christopher Nolan
Aaron Norris
Sonny Parsons
Sam Peckinpah
Wolfgang Petersen
Prachya Pinkaew
Fernando Poe Jr.
Ted Post
Albert Pyun
Sam Raimi
Brett Ratner
Spiro Razatoz
Matt Reeves
Nicolas Winding Refn
Kevin Reynolds
Ronnie Ricketts
Guy Ritchie
Panna Rittikrai
Eddie Rodriguez
Robert Rodriguez
Philip J. Roth
Chuck Russell
Mikael Salomon
Yeon Sang-ho
Cirio H. Santiago
Barbet Schroeder
Ridley Scott
Tony Scott
Dominic Sena
Jack Sholder
Don Siegel
Bryan Singer
John Singleton
Ching Siu-tung
Brian Trenchard-Smith
Zack Snyder
Stephen Sommers
Steven Spielberg
Roger Spottiswoode
Chad Stahelski
John Stockwell
Oliver Stone
John Sturges
Lee Tamahori
Billy Tang
Quentin Tarantino
J. Lee Thompson
Stanley Tong
Josh Trank
Pete Travis
Colin Trevorrow
Dante Varona
Matthew Vaughn
Paul Verhoeven
Roi Vinzon
The Wachowskis
James Wan
Marc Webb
Peter Weir
Simon West
Joss Whedon
Kurt Wimmer
Michael Winner
Tommy Wirkola
Len Wiseman
Kirk Wong
John Woo
Peter Yates
Zhang Yimou
Wilson Yip
Terence Young
Ronny Yu
Corey Yuen
Joseph Zito
Edward Zwick
Siddharth Anand
J. J. Abrams
Woo-ping Yuen
Gordon Chan
Tim Burton
Peter Jackson
Alex Proyas
Russo brothers
Jon Watts
Keishi Ōtomo
Guillermo del Toro
Gore Verbinski

Action stars who have directed their own action movies
Jackie Chan: The Fearless Hyena (1979), The Young Master (1980), Dragon Lord (1982), Project A (1983), Police Story (1985), Armour of God (1986), Project A Part II (1987), Police Story 2 (1988), Miracles (1989), Armour of God II: Operation Condor (1991), etc...
Clint Eastwood: High Plains Drifter (1973), The Eiger Sanction (1975), The Outlaw Josey Wales (1976), The Gauntlet (1977), Firefox (1982), Sudden Impact (1983), Pale Rider (1985), The Rookie (1990)
Mel Gibson: Braveheart (1995)
Sammo Hung: Enter the Fat Dragon (1978), Knockabout (1979), Encounters of the Spooky Kind (1980), The Prodigal Son (1981), Wheels on Meals (1984), Millionaire's Express (1986), Eastern Condors (1987), Dragons Forever (1988), Pedicab Driver (1989), etc...
Bruce Lee: Way of the Dragon (1972)
Jet Li: Born to Defence (1986)
Dolph Lundgren: The Defender (2004), The Mechanik (2005), Missionary Man (2007), Diamond Dogs (2007), Command Performance (2009), Icarus (2010)
Steven Seagal: On Deadly Ground (1994)
Sylvester Stallone: Rambo (2008), The Expendables (2010)
Jean-Claude Van Damme: The Quest (1996), Full Love (TBA)
Donnie Yen: Legend of the Wolf (1997), Ballistic Kiss (1998), Shanghai Affairs (1998)
Biao Yuen: Peacock King (1989), A Kid from Tibet (1992)

Action films
Film